La Crescent is a white grape varietal developed by the University of Minnesota's cold hardy grape breeding program. Since its release to the market in 2002 La Crescent has been planted with success in Iowa, Kansas, Minnesota, Missouri, Montana, Nebraska, New Hampshire, New York, Ohio, Oregon, Vermont, and Wisconsin.

History
La Crescent was invented by U of MN researchers James Luby and Peter Hemstad. The Regents of the University of Minnesota was awarded US Patent 14,617 in 2004.  Those wishing to propagate La Crescent must obtain a license from the U. of MN

See also

Frontenac (grape), another hybrid from the University of Minnesota

References 

White wine grape varieties
Hybrid grape varieties
American wine